The relationship between Islam and domestic violence is disputed. Even among Muslims, the uses and interpretations of Sharia, the moral code and religious law of Islam, lack consensus. Variations in interpretation are due to different schools of Islamic jurisprudence, histories and politics of religious institutions, conversions, reforms, and education.

Domestic violence among the Muslim community is considered a complicated human rights issue due to varying legal remedies for women by the nations where they live, the extent to which they have support or opportunities to divorce their husbands, cultural stigma to hide evidence of abuse, and inability to have abuse recognized by police or the judicial system in some Muslim nations.

Definition 

According to the Merriam-Webster dictionary definition, domestic violence is: "the inflicting of physical injury by one family or household member on another; also: a repeated or habitual pattern of such behavior."

Coomaraswamy defines domestic violence as "violence that occurs within the private sphere, generally between individuals who are related through intimacy, blood or law... [It is] nearly always a gender-specific crime, perpetrated by men against women." It used is as a strong form of control and oppression.

In 1993, The United Nations Declaration on the Elimination of Violence Against Women defined domestic violence as: Physical, sexual and psychological violence occurring in the family, including battering, sexual abuse of female children in the household, dowry-related violence, marital rape, female genital mutilation and other traditional practices harmful to women, non-spousal violence and violence related to exploitation.

Islamic texts

In the Quran 

The interpretation of Surah An-Nisa, 34 is subject to debate among Muslim scholars, along with the various translations of the passage which can read 'strike them' or '(lightly) strike them' or 'beat them' or 'scourge them' or 'take practical action with them', depending on the translator.    Quran 4:34 reads:

Quran interpretations that support domestic violence 
Hajjar Lisa claims Shari'a law encourages "domestic violence" against women when a husband suspects nushuz (disobedience, disloyalty, rebellion, ill conduct) in his wife. Other scholars claim wife beating, for nashizah, is not consistent with modern perspectives of Qur'an. Some conservative translations find that Muslim husbands are permitted to act what is known in Arabic as Idribuhunna with the use of "Strike," and sometimes as much as to hit, chastise, or beat.

In some exegesis such as those of Ibn Kathir(1300-1373AD) and Muhammad ibn Jarir al-Tabari(839-923AD), the actions prescribed in Surah 4:34 above, are to be taken in sequence: the husband is to admonish the wife, after which (if his previous correction was unsuccessful) he may remain separate from her, after which (if his previous correction was still unsuccessful) he may
 give her a light tapping with a Siwak. Ibn 'Abbas, The Cousin of the Prophet, is recorded in the Tafsir of al-Tabari for verse 4:34 as saying that beating without severity is using a siwak (small toothbrush) or a similar object.

A translated passage by Taqi-ud-Din al-Hilali and Muhsin Khan in 2007 defines men as the protectors, guardians and maintainers of women, because Allah has made the one of them to excel the other, and because they spend (to support them) from their means.  Upon seeing ill-conduct (i.e. disobedience, rebellion, nashuz in Arabic) by his wife, a man may admonish them (first), (next), refuse to share their beds, (and last) beat them (lightly, if it is useful), but if they return to obedience, seek not against them means.

Some Islamic scholars and commentators have emphasized that hitting, even where permitted, is not to be harsh or some even contend that they should be "more or less symbolic." According to Abdullah Yusuf Ali and Ibn Kathir, the consensus of Islamic scholars is that the above verse describes a light beating. Abu Shaqqa refers to the edict of Hanafi scholar al-Jassas (d. 981) who notes that the reprimand should be "A non-violent blow with siwak [a small stick used to clean the teeth] or similar. This means that to hit with any other means is legally Islamically forbidden."

Quran interpretations that do not support domestic violence 
Indicating the subjective nature of the translations, particularly regarding domestic abuse, Ahmed Ali's English translation of the word idribu is "to forsake, avoid, or leave."  His English translation of Quran 4:34 is:
...As for women you feel are averse, talk to them cursively; then leave them alone in bed (without molesting them), and go to bed with them (when they are willing). However, in his native Urdu translation of verse 4:34, he translates idribuhunna as "strike them."

Laleh Bakhtiar postulates that daraba is defined as "to go away." This interpretation is supported by the fact that the word darabtum, which means to "go abroad" in the sake of Allah, is used in the same Surah (in 4:94) and is derived from
the same root word (daraba) as idribuhunna in 4:34. However, this translation is negated by the fact that most definitions of daraba in Edward William Lane's Arabic-English Lexicon are related to physical beating and that when the root word daraba and its derivatives are used in the Qur'an in relation to humans or their body parts, it exclusively means physically striking them with a Siwak(Toothbrush) (e.g. in Qur'an 2:7337:93, 8:12, 8:50, 47:4 and 47:27).

The keywords of Verse 34 of Surah An-Nisa come with various meanings, each of which enables us to know a distinct aspect, meaning and matter. Each aspect, i.e., meanings proposed by commentators, translators, and scholars throughout history for this verse, is according to a distinct wonted system of the family in history. "Zarb" does not mean assault or any form of violence against women. Rather, it means a practical action to inspire disobedient women to obey the legitimate rights of their spouse.

Jurisprudence 
The discussions in all four Sunni law schools institutionalised the viewpoint of the Quranic exegeses by turning wife-beating into a means of discipline against rebellious wives. Ayesha Chaudhry has examined the pre-colonial Hanafi texts on domestic violence. Her findings are as follows. Hanafi scholars emphasised the procedure of admonishing, abandoning and hitting the wife. The Hanafi jurists say that it is the husband's duty to physically discipline his wife's arrogance (nushuz). They permitted the husband a lot of leeway in the severity of the beating. While Hanafi scholars admonish husbands to treat their wives with kindness and equity, they do not recognize the principle of qisas (retributive punishment) for injuries sustained in marriage, unless they cause death, permitting the husband to hit his wife without any liability and that Hanafi scholars assert that the husband is allowed to hit his wife even if that causes wounds or broken bones their only condition is that the beating must not kill her this view was taken from Hanafi Scholar Al-Jassas and within this framework they emphasised the need of following the sequence of admonishment, abandonment and hitting. However, al-Jassas also says that the reprimand should only be "A non-violent blow with siwak [a small stick used to clean the teeth] or something similar to it.

Al-Kasani added that the admonishment contains two steps: gentle admonishment and then harsh admonishment. Al-Nasafi adds that if a wife dies during sex, the husband is not liable, Al-Nasafi interpreted this to be the position of Imam Abu Hanifah. Ḥanafi Scholars used general qualifiers to describe the type of hitting a husband might undertake when disciplining his wife the hitting should be non-extreme (ghayr mubarrih) and that  should not cause disfigurement. Ibn al-Humam believed that a husband can whip his wife with only ten lashes. However, al-Nasafi put the maximum limit at 100 lashes. Al-Nasafi also ruled that if a wife dies from the beating the husband is not liable as long as he does not exceed 100 strikes. However, if he exceeds 100 lashes then he is considered to have crossed the limit of discipline into abuse and he would have to pay blood money (diya). Ibn Nujaym and al-Haskafi also ruled that a husband cannot be punished with the death penalty if he kills his wife while disciplining her. He only owes blood money.

Evidence of judicial records from the sixteenth century on wards show that Ottoman judges who followed the Hanafi school allowed divorce because of abuse. This did this partially by borrowing rulings from other schools of thought and partially by blending abuse with blasphemy since they reasoned a "true Muslim would not beat his wife." A number of women in British India between the years of 1920 and 1930s left Islam to obtain judicial divorce because Hanafi law did not permit women to seek divorce in case of cruel treatment by a husband. Mawlana Thanawi reviewed the issue and borrowed the Maliki rulings which permits women to seek divorce because of cruelty by the husband. He expanded the grounds of divorce available to women under Hanafi law.

According to Ayesha Chaudhary, unlike Hanafi scholars who were more interested in protecting a husband's right to hit his wife for disciplinary purposes, the Malikis tried to stop husbands from abusing this right. The Maliki scholars only allowed striking a rebellious wife with the purpose of rectifying her. They specified that the strike should not be extreme or severe, must not leave marks or cause injuries and that the strike must not be fearsome, cause fractures, break bones, cause disfiguring wounds while punching in general and punching her in the chest were unacceptable and that the strike could not harm the wife. The Malikis held that a husband would be legally liable if the hitting led to the wife's death. They also did not allow a husband to hit his wife if he did not believe the hitting would cause her to stop her arrogance. The Shafi'i scholars upheld the permissibility of wife beating but encouraged avoiding it and did not hold the imperative "wa-ḍribūhunna" to mean an obligatory command. Shafi scholars also restricted what the husband could do in regards to hitting his wife, that he should only hit his wife if he thinks it will be effective in deterring her from her arrogance ; he should hit her in a non-extreme (ghayr mubarrih) manner; he should avoid hitting her face, sensitive places, and places of beauty and not hit her in a manner that causes disfiguration, bleeding, that he should not hit the same place repeatedly, loss of limbs, or death. According to Shafi scholars a husband is permitted to hit his wife with a cloth, sandal and a siwak but not with a whip.  The views of the Hanbali scholars are a mix of the positions of the other three schools of law.

Undesirability of beating
Jonathan A.C. Brown says:
The vast majority of the ulama across the Sunni schools of law inherited the Prophet's unease over domestic violence and placed further restrictions on the evident meaning of the 'Wife Beating Verse'. A leading Meccan scholar from the second generation of Muslims, Ata' bin Abi Rabah, counseled a husband not to beat his wife even if she ignored him but rather to express his anger in some other way. Darimi, a teacher of both Tirmidhi and Muslim bin Hajjaj as well as a leading early scholar in Iran, collected all the Hadiths showing Muhammad's disapproval of beating in a chapter entitled 'The Prohibition on Striking Women'. A thirteenth-century scholar from Granada, Ibn Faras, notes that one camp of ulama had staked out a stance forbidding striking a wife altogether, declaring it contrary to the Prophet's example and denying the authenticity of any Hadiths that seemed to permit beating. Even Ibn Hajar, the pillar of late medieval Sunni Hadith scholarship, concludes that, contrary to what seems to be an explicit command in the Qur'an, the Hadiths of the Prophet leave no doubt that striking one's wife to discipline her actually falls under the Shariah ruling of 'strongly disliked' or 'disliked verging on prohibited'.

According to Honour, Violence, Women and Islam, and Islamic scholar Dr. Muhammad Sharif Chaudhry, Muhammad condemns violence against women, by saying: "How loathsome (Ajeeb) it is that one of you should hit his wife as a slave is hit, and then sleep with her at the end of the day."

Restraint in beating

Scholars and commentators have stated that Muhammad directed men not to hit their wives' faces, not to beat their wives in such a way as would leave marks on their body, and not to beat their wives as to cause pain (ghayr mubarrih). Scholars too have stipulated against beating or disfigurement, with others such as the Syrian jurist Ibn Abidin prescribing ta'zir punishments against abusive husbands.

In a certain hadith, Muhammad discouraged beating one's wife severely:

Bahz bin Hakim reported on the authority of his father from his grandfather (Mu'awiyah ibn Haydah) as saying:
"I said: Messenger of Allah, how should we approach our wives and how should we leave them? He replied: Approach your tilth when or how you will, give her (your wife) food when you take food, clothe when you clothe yourself, do not revile her face, and do not beat her." The same hadith has been narrated with slightly different wording. In other versions of this hadith, only beating the face is discouraged.

Some jurists argue that even when beating is acceptable under the Quran, it is still discouraged. Ibn Kathir in concluding his exegesis exhorts men to not beat their wives, quoting a hadith from Muhammad: "Do not hit God's servants" (here referring to women). The narration continues, stating that some while after the edict, "Umar complained to the Messenger of God that many women turned against their husbands. Muhammad gave his permission that the men could hit their wives in cases of rebelliousness. The women then turned to the wives of the Prophet and complained about their husbands. The Prophet said: 'Many women have turned to my family complaining about their husbands. Verily, these men are not among the best of you."

Incidence among Muslims

Domestic violence is considered to be a problem in Muslim-majority cultures, where women face social pressures to submit to violent husbands and not file charges or flee.

In deference to Surah 4:34, many nations with Shari'a law have refused to consider or prosecute cases of "domestic abuse." In 2010, the highest court of United Arab Emirates (Federal Supreme Court) considered a lower court's ruling, and upheld a husband's right to "chastise" his wife and children physically. Article 53 of the United Arab Emirates' penal code acknowledges the right of a "chastisement by a husband to his wife and the chastisement of minor children" so long as the assault does not exceed the limits prescribed by Shari'a. The Council of Islamic Ideology, a constitutional body of Pakistan that advises the government on the compatibility of laws with Islam, has recommended authorizing husbands to ‘lightly’ beat disobedient wives. When asked why is beating a wife lightly permitted? The chairman of Pakistan's Council of Islamic Ideology, Mullah Maulana Sheerani said, "The recommendations are according to the Quran and Sunnah. You can not ask someone to reconsider the Quran". In Lebanon, KAFA, an organization campaigning against violence and the exploitation of women, alleges that as many as three-quarters of all Lebanese females have suffered physically at the hands of husbands or male relatives at some point in their lives. An effort has been underway to remove domestic violence cases from Shari'a driven religious courts to civil penal code driven courts. Social workers claim failure of religious courts in addressing numerous instances of domestic abuse in Syria, Pakistan, Egypt, Palestine, Morocco, Iran, Yemen and Saudi Arabia. In 2013, Saudi Arabia approved a new law on domestic violence, which sets penalties for all types of sexual and physical abuse, in the workplace and at home. Penalties can be up to a year in prison and a fine up to 13,000 dollars. The law also provides shelter for the victims of domestic violence.

According to Pamela K. Taylor, co-founder of Muslims for Progressive Values, such violence is not part of the religion, but rather more of a cultural aspect. In the academic publication Honour, Violence, Women and Islam edited by Mohammad Mazher Idriss and Tahir Abbas, it is said that there is no authority in the Quran for the type of regular and frequent acts of violence that women experience from their abusive husbands. Furthermore, the actions of many Muslim husbands lack the expected level of control in two elements from the verse, admonishment and separation. The separation dictates not only the physical separation, but also abstinence from marital sex.

Laws and prosecution
According to Ahmad Shafaat, an Islamic scholar, "If the husband beats a wife without respecting the limits set down by the Qur'an and Hadith, then she can take him to court and if ruled in favor has the right to apply the law of retaliation and beat the husband as he beat her." However, laws against domestic violence, as well as whether these laws are enforced, vary throughout the Muslim world.

Some women want to fight the abuses they face as Muslims; these women want "to retain the communal extended family aspects of traditional society, while eliminating its worst abuses, by seeking easy ability to divorce men for abuse and forced marriages."

Victim support programs 
In Malaysia, the largest government-run hospital implemented a program to intervene in cases where domestic violence seems possible.  The woman is brought to a room to meet with a counselor who works with the patient to determine if the woman is in danger and should be transferred to a shelter for safety.  If the woman does not wish to go to the shelter, she is encouraged to see a social worker and file a police report.  If the injury is very serious, investigations begin immediately.

Divorce 

Though some Muslim scholars, such as Ahmad Shafaat, contend that Islam permits women to be divorced in cases of domestic violence. Divorce may be unavailable to women as a practical or legal matter.

The Quran states:
(2:231) And when you have divorced women and they have fulfilled the term of their prescribed period, either take them back on reasonable basis or set them free on reasonable basis. But do not take them back to hurt them, and whoever does that, then he has wronged himself. And treat not the Verses of Allah as a jest, but remember Allah's Favours on you, and that which He has sent down to you of the Book and Al-Hikmah [the Prophet's Sunnah, legal ways, Islamic jurisprudence] whereby He instructs you. And fear Allah, and know that Allah is All-Aware of everything.

Although Islam permits women to divorce for domestic violence, they are subject to the laws of their nation which might make it quite difficult for a woman to obtain a divorce.

Most women's rights activists concede that while divorce can provide potential relief, it does not constitute an adequate protection or even an option for many women, with discouraging factors such as lack of resources or support to establish alternative domestic arrangements and social expectations and pressures.

See also 

 AHA Foundation, non-profit for women's rights in western countries
 Dowry death
 Female infanticide
 Femicide
 Gender roles in Islam
 Glossary of Islam
 Islamic feminism
 Peaceful Families Project - Muslim organization
 Sharia#Women
 Taliban treatment of women
 Violence against women
 Women and Islam

Other
 International Journal for the Psychology of Religion
 Outline of domestic violence
 Victimology
 Violence against women
 Women's rights

References 
Citations

Notes

Further reading 
 'In the Book We Have Left Out Nothing': The Ethical Problem of the Existence of Verse 4:34 in the Qur'an" by Laury Silvers

Domestic violence
Women's rights in Islam
Islam-related controversies
Crimes against women
Islam and violence